Kikeo Khaykhamphithoune (born 11 August 1957) is a Laotian politician. He is a member of the Lao People's Revolutionary Party. He is a representative of the National Assembly of Laos for the city of Vientiane (Constituency 1).

References

Lao People's Revolutionary Party politicians
Living people
Members of the National Assembly of Laos
1957 births
Deputy Prime Ministers of Laos
Members of the 8th Central Committee of the Lao People's Revolutionary Party
Members of the 9th Central Committee of the Lao People's Revolutionary Party
Members of the 10th Central Committee of the Lao People's Revolutionary Party
Members of the 11th Central Committee of the Lao People's Revolutionary Party
Members of the 11th Politburo of the Lao People's Revolutionary Party
Members of the 10th Secretariat of the Lao People's Revolutionary Party